is a Japanese manga series written and illustrated by Kotono Kato. It tells the story about Tuğril Mahmut, a young military officer and his exploits to protect his country from invasion by a neighboring empire. The manga is serialized in Kodansha's Monthly Shōnen Sirius since July 2007. As of March 2022, twenty-five tankōbon volumes have been published.

An anime television series produced by MAPPA aired from July to December 2017. Amazon Video streamed the series worldwide as it aired in Japan.

In 2017, Altair: A Record of Battles won the 41st Kodansha Manga Awards in the shōnen category.

Plot

Set in the western part of the great continent Rumeliana, Mahmut is a young war orphan and the youngest Pasha in the Türkiye Stratocracy who desires to ensure that war never occurs. Unfortunately, after an assassination of a politician, Türkiye is under the looming threat of the militaristic Balt-Rhein Empire. After playing a vital role in solving two schemes within his country, Mahmut sets out on a journey to see more the outside world, only to witness Balt-Rhein's growing influence on the continent. To protect his homeland, Mahmut and his companions travel across West Rumeliana to form alliances between his country and the other nations to face against the Balt-Rhein Empire and their frightening expansionist movement. With the creation of the Tripartite Military Alliance with Greater Türkiye, Republic of Venedik, and Urado Kingdom, and the cooperation of the Cuore Alliance, the Anti-Imperial Alliance battles against the Balt-Rhein Empire in the Great Rumeliana War.

Media

Manga

Altair: A Record of Battles is written and illustrated by Kotono Kato. The series began in Kodansha's shōnen manga magazine Monthly Shōnen Sirius on July 26, 2007. In June 2020, it was announced that the series was approaching its climax. In February 2023, it was announced that manga will end in "a few" chapters. Kodansha has collected its chapters into individual tankōbon volumes. The first volume was published on April 23, 2008. As of March 9, 2022, twenty-five volumes have been published.

Kodansha's North American subsidiary Kodansha USA announced that it would release the series in English via its digital platform, starting on March 21, 2017.

Spin-offs
The series inspired the Shōkoku no! four-panel manga on Sirius''' official website in 2012. Monthly Shōnen Sirius. also serialized Shiina Soga's , a short, comedic chibi-styled manga from 2012 to 2013, with a total of 21 chapters and released in a single tankōbon volume. On August 26, 2017, a special chapter of Shōkoku no Altair-san was released in the October 2017 issue of the Monthly Shōnen Sirius magazine.

Another spin-off, titled , written by Hirokazu Kobayashi and illustrated by Kotono Kato's sister, Chika Katō's, was serialized in Monthly Shōnen Sirius from January 26, 2016 to April 26, 2019. The set far to the east of Rumeliana, where the more Asian-influence countries exist and takes roughly six months ahead of the main series. The plot focus on the island nation of Kusanagi, which has been annexed by the larger country of Çinili and fallen into ruin. Subaru masquerades as the nation's former prince and tries to leads a rebellion to free her country. Kodansha collected its chapters in seven tankōbon volumes, released from January 17, 2017 to September 9, 2019.

Anime

In December 2016, Aniplex opened a website announcing that Kazuhiro Furuhashi was directing a "Project Altair" anime series at MAPPA, but did not state any other specifics. Later that month, images from the official website of Monthly Shonen Sirius revealed that "Project Altair" was an adaptation of Altair: A Record of Battles. Script composition is handled by Noboru Takagi while Ryo Kawasaki composed the music. The series aired from July 7 to December 22, 2017, on the MBS "Animeism" programming block,

On June 29, 2017, it was announced that Amazon Video service will be exclusively streaming Altair: A Record of Battles in more than 200 countries worldwide, and its "Anime Strike" channel will simulcast the series as it airs in Japan. The anime series released the first Blu-ray/DVD set and its limited editions bundles with bonus booklet, a Soundtrack CD, and Drama CD on October 25, 2017. The second Blu-ray/DVD set and its limited editions bundles with bonus booklet, another Soundtrack CD, and DJCD of the series's Radio Broadcast was released on December 27, 2017. The third Blu-ray/DVD set and its limited editions bundles with bonus booklet, another Soundtrack CD, and another Drama CD was released on February 28, 2018. The fourth and final Blu-ray/DVD set and its limited editions bundles with bonus booklet, animation drawings, and another DJCD of the series's Radio Broadcast was released on April 25, 2018.

Other media
On November 29, 2014, Kotono Katō released an illustration book titled  for Altair: A Record of Battles. On October 6, 2017, a new art book titled , containing over 170 illustrations, was released to mark a decade of serialisation.

On August 9, 2017, an official fanbook titled  was released, containing both illustrations, background, and characters profiles of the series. A preview of the booklet with rough sketches was released on June 26 in the Shōnen Sirius August 2017 Issue.

ReceptionAltair: A Record of Battles won the 41st Kodansha Manga Awards in the shōnen'' category in 2017.

References

External links
 
 

2017 anime television series debuts
Anime Strike
Animeism
Comics set in Turkey
Historical fantasy anime and manga
Kodansha manga
MAPPA
Shōnen manga
Television shows set in Turkey
Winner of Kodansha Manga Award (Shōnen)